The Vietnamese Women's National Cup, officially Women's National Cup, also called Thái Sơn Bắc National Cup for sponsorship reasons, is the top cup competition for women's football clubs in Vietnam – designed as an equivalent to the Vietnamese National Football Cup.

Final by season

References

External links 
Cup at soccerway.com

Sports competitions in Vietnam